The 2011 Liège–Bastogne–Liège was the 97th running of the Liège–Bastogne–Liège, a single-day cycling race. It was the twelfth race of the 2011 UCI World Tour season.

Philippe Gilbert of  became only the second rider to win all three Ardennes classics, after  rider Davide Rebellin first did so in 2004, by winning a three-man sprint to complete a run of four victories within ten days with another victory in Brabantse Pijl to go with the Ardennes classics.

Results

References

External links

 Official website

Liege
Liège–Bastogne–Liège
Liege